The 2022 AFF Futsal Cup was the seventh edition of AFF Futsal Cup. The tournament was held in Nakhon Ratchasima, Thailand from 4 to 10 September 2022.

Participants 
  Hongyen Thakam (Host)
  Bintang Timur Surabaya
  Down Town Sport
  Perwira
  Ramelau
  Sahako
  Selangor MAC

Group stage

Group A

Match

Group B

Match

Knockout stage

Match 
Semi Final

Third Place

Final

Winner

See also 
AFF Futsal Cup

References 

AFF Futsal Club Championship
International futsal competitions hosted by Thailand
Sport in Nakhon Ratchasima province
AFF Futsal Cup
AFF Futsal Cup